Topana is a commune in Olt County, Muntenia, Romania. It is composed of five villages: Cândelești, Ciorâca, Cojgărei, Topana and Ungureni.

References

Communes in Olt County
Localities in Muntenia